Sapphire is a blue gemstone in the corundum family.

Sapphire (s), SAPPHIRE, or The Sapphires may also refer to:

Animals
Sapphire (horse), 2004 Olympic silver-medal-winning horse
Sapphire butterfly, the gossamer-winged butterfly of the genus Heliophorus
Sapphire hummingbird, a name used for several species of hummingbird, including:
Blue-chinned sapphire
Golden-tailed sapphire
 Rufous-throated sapphire (Amazilia sapphirina), previously belonged to Hylocharis
Sapphire, several hummingbird species in the genus Hylocharis
 Blue-headed sapphire (Hylocharis grayi)
 Blue-throated sapphire (Hylocharis eliciae)
 Flame-rumped sapphire (Hylocharis pyropygia), validity questionable
 Gilded sapphire (Hylocharis chrysura)
 Humboldt's sapphire (Hylocharis humboldtii)
 White-chinned sapphire (Hylocharis cyanus)

Arts, entertainment, and media

Fictional characters
Sapphire (character), a character in the DC Comics universe
Sapphire, a character played by Jasmine Jardot in the British web series Corner Shop Show
Sapphire, a main character in Pokémon Adventures
Sapphire, a character in Sapphire & Steel, a British science fiction television series
Sapphire, a character in Steven Universe
Princess Sapphire, a character in the manga Princess Knight
Sapphire Rhodonite, a character in the video game Disgaea 3: Absence of Justice
Sapphire Stevens, a character in the 1920s–1950s radio/film/television series Amos 'n' Andy
Sapphire Trollzawa, a character from the animated series Trollz
Sapphire Kawashima, a main character in the Sound! Euphonium series

Films 
Sapphire (film), a 1959 British film starring Nigel Patrick
The Sapphires (film), a 2012 Australian film
The Sapphires (Australian band), subject of the film

Games
Ginga Fukei Densetsu Sapphire, a 1995 rare video game for the PC Engine
Pokémon Sapphire, a 2002 video game for the Game Boy Advance
Pokémon Alpha Sapphire, a 2014 remake of Pokémon Sapphire, released for the Nintendo 3DS

Music

Groups
Sapphire, a band that includes members of the band Alyson Avenue
The Sapphires (American band), a 1960s American pop group
The Sapphires (Australian band), a 1960s Aboriginal Australian trio of female singers
The Sapphhires (backing vocalists), a 1950s male Australian trio of backing singers, worked with Col Joye

Albums
Sapphire (John Martyn album), 1984
Sapphire (Teena Marie album), 2006
Sapphire, a 1995 album by the Japanese jazz musician Keiko Matsui

Songs
"Sapphire", an instrumental piece by Norwegian band TNT from the 1987 album Tell No Tales

Brands and enterprises 
Sapphire (books), a British book publisher
Sapphire (clothing brand), a Pakistani company
Bombay Sapphire, a brand of London dry gin produced by the Bombay Spirits Company
 Chase Sapphire Preferred Visa, an Ultimate Rewards Visa Signature credit card of JPMorgan Chase
 Chase Sapphire Reserve Visa, an elite Ultimate Rewards Visa Infinite credit card of JPMorgan Chase similar to the JPMorgan Reserve that replaced the Palladium Card, in 2016
Sapphire Energy is an energy company that produces oil made from algae
Sapphire Gentlemen's Club, a chain of adult entertainment venues
Sapphire Ventures, a venture capital firm

Computing and technology
Sapphire Technology, a manufacturer of PC hardware
SAPPHIRE (Health care), a health information system based on Semantic Web and RDF language
SAPPHIRE, SAP's customer-facing event
Sapphire programming framework, a framework in the PHP language, distributed with the SilverStripe content management system
Sapphire Worm, another name for the SQL slammer worm

Jubilees
Sapphire jubilee, a celebration to mark a 65th anniversary
 Sapphire Jubilee of Queen Elizabeth II, commemoration of the 65th year of Queen Elizabeth's reign

Organizations
Sapphire, the rape investigation unit of the Metropolitan Police Service of Greater London, UK
SAPPHIRE, a human resource management committee of XLRI Jamshedpur

People
Olga Sapphire (1907–1981), stage name of the Russian-Japanese ballerina born Olga Ivanovna Pavlova
Sapphire (author) (born 1950), African-American poet and author born Ramona Lofton
Sapphire (wrestler) or Juanita Wright (1935–1996), professional wrestling valet and wrestler
Sapphire Elia (born 1987), British actress

Places
Sapphire, North Carolina, a community in the United States
Sapphire, Queensland, a town in Australia
Sapphiretown, South Australia, a locality in Australia

Ships
HMS Sapphire, the name of several ships of the Royal Navy
USS Sapphire, more than one United States Navy ship

Transportation
Sapphire (satellite), a Canadian space surveillance satellite launched in 2013
Sapphire (train), (German: Saphir) a European express train
Arriva Sapphire, a premium brand of Arriva bus services in the United Kingdom
Armstrong Siddeley Sapphire (motor car), a series of UK post-war cars 
Armstrong Siddeley Sapphire, a jet engine also known as the Wright J65
Ford Sapphire, a sedan version of the Ford Sierra, sold in South Africa and the United Kingdom 
Sapphire Aircraft Australia Sapphire LSA, an Australian ultralight aircraft

Other uses
Istanbul Sapphire, a skyscraper in Istanbul, Turkey
Sapphire (color), an intense shade of blue
Sapphire, an African-American stereotype also called Angry Black Woman
Sapphires (Super Fours), a women's cricket team that competed in the Super Fours
Sapphire Stakes (ATC), an Australian horse race

See also
Saffire – The Uppity Blues Women, a three-woman blues band
Safire (disambiguation)
Saphir (disambiguation)
SAPHIRE, Systems Analysis Programs for Hands-on Integrated Reliability Evaluations

Saphire Longmore (born 1976), Jamaican politician and former model 
Sapphire & Steel, a British television science-fiction fantasy series (1979 to 1982)
Zefir (disambiguation)
Zephir (disambiguation)
Zephyr (disambiguation)

English feminine given names